Playing House is an American sitcom that premiered on April 29, 2014, on the USA Network. Lennon Parham and Jessica St. Clair created and star in the series, which is inspired by their real-life friendship.

On January 14, 2016, the series was renewed for a third season, which aired from June 23 to July 14, 2017 with each episode available via VOD.

On October 30, 2017, series stars and creators Jessica St. Clair and Lennon Parham, announced over an emotional video message that USA Network canceled the show.

Premise
When mother-to-be Maggie ends her marriage upon discovering her husband's affair with a woman online, she turns to her best friend Emma for support. In order to help Maggie in her time of need, Emma gives up her successful business career in China to return to their hometown of Pinebrook and help her friend raise her newborn baby.

Cast

Main
 Lennon Parham as Maggie Caruso – Emma's best friend since childhood, who was pregnant and newly single after a sudden separation from her husband in the first season. She is the mother of Charlotte Emma Caruso.
 Jessica St. Clair as Emma Crawford – Maggie's best friend since childhood. She leaves her overseas job in China to come home and to help Maggie.
 Keegan-Michael Key as Mark Rodriguez – A local cop and childhood friend of Maggie and Emma. Mark and Emma used to date in high school.
 Zach Woods as Zach "Zoo" Harper – Maggie's younger brother.
 Brad Morris as Bruce Caruso – Maggie's ex-husband. He is the father of Charlotte.

Recurring
 Jane Kaczmarek as Gwen Crawford – Emma's mother.
 Lindsay Sloane as  Tina "Bird Bones" Steigerman – Mark's wife and former nemesis to Emma.
 Gerry Bednob as Mr. Nanjiani – a local townsperson, originally from Pakistan.
 Marissa Jaret Winokur as Candy – a bartender at Rosie's, the local restaurant.
 Ian Roberts as Ian – Mark's partner on the police force.
 Sandy Martin as Mary Pat – Bruce's mother. 
 Norma Michaels as Ms. Johannsen – a prickly old woman living in the town.
 Kyle Bornheimer as Dan – a Rabbi.
 Ben Willbond as Dr. Clive Ericson, a cold and distant doctor supervising Maggie on clinical rotation.

Episodes

Season 1 (2014)

Season 2 (2015)

Season 3 (2017)

Production and development
Playing House first appeared on the USA Network development slate in February 2013, under the name Untitled Lennon Parham/Jessica St. Clair Project. The series was created by Lennon Parham and Jessica St. Clair who also star in the series and executive produce alongside Scot Armstrong and Ravi Nandan, and the production companies Universal Cable Productions and American Work.

Casting announcements began in February 2013, with Parham, St. Clair and Zach Woods announced as starring in the series when USA Network ordered the presentation. Parham and St. Clair signed on to play the lead roles of Maggie, an expectant mother who turns to her career-driven best friend Emma. Keegan-Michael Key and Brad Morris then signed on to the series, with Key playing the role of Mark, a cop who holds resentment towards Emma because she turned down his proposal and left town twelve years earlier, and Morris playing the role of Bruce, Maggie's husband, who cheats on her.

On May 16, 2013, Playing House was ordered to series, making it the second original half-hour comedy series for the USA Network after Sirens.

On December 8, 2014, USA Network renewed Playing House for an eight-episode second season. Through a new model, each of the episodes will be released on video-on-demand platforms before airing a week later on USA. On January 14, 2016, Playing House was renewed for a third season.

Reception
The first season of Playing House scored 65 out of 100 on Metacritic based on 13 "generally favorable" reviews. On another review aggregator site, Rotten Tomatoes, it holds a 76% rating with an average rating of 7.1 out of 10, based on 17 reviews. The site's critical consensus reads: "Jessica St. Clair and Lennon Parham are a comedy duo worth watching, and their chemistry helps to make Playing House reasonably enjoyable and perceptive."

The second season was met with even more positive reviews from critics. On Rotten Tomatoes, it holds an average of 100% with an average of 7 out of 10, based on 6 reviews.

Awards and nominations

References

External links
 
 

2010s American single-camera sitcoms
2014 American television series debuts
2017 American television series endings
English-language television shows
Television series by Universal Content Productions
USA Network original programming
Television shows set in Connecticut
Television shows featuring audio description